Vlad-Cornel Bădălicescu (born 4 August 1988 in Bucharest) is a Romanian rugby union football player. He plays as a prop  for professional SuperLiga club Steaua București. He also plays for Romania's national team, the Oaks, making his international debut at the 2010–12 European Nations Cup in a match against the Os Lobos.

Career
During his career Vlad Bădălicescu also played for Dinamo București, Farul Constanța, Olipmia București, Bucharest Wolves and L'Aquila Rugby.

References

External links

1988 births
Living people
Rugby union players from Bucharest
Romanian rugby union players
Romania international rugby union players
București Wolves players
CS Dinamo București (rugby union) players
RCJ Farul Constanța players
CSM București (rugby union) players
CSA Steaua București (rugby union) players
Rugby union props